Werauhia williamsii is a species of flowering plant in the genus Werauhia. It is a terrestrial bromeliad, native the montane forests of Costa Rica and western Panama.

It inhabits the Talamancan montane forests ecoregion, where it grows in the shrub understory of upper montane forests, from approximately 2,300 to 3,200 meters elevation.

References

williamsii
Flora of Costa Rica
Flora of Panama
Flora of the Talamancan montane forests
Plants described in 1995